The 1964–65 Weber State Wildcats men's basketball team represented Weber State College during the 1964–65 NCAA University Division basketball season. In the second year of the Big Sky Conference, the Wildcats were led by fifth-year head coach Dick Motta and played their home games on campus at Wildcat Gym in Ogden, Utah.

Weber State won its first title; the conference did not yet have an automatic berth to the 23-team NCAA tournament, which came three years later.

References

External links
Sports Reference – Weber State Wildcats: 1964–65 basketball season
2015–16 Media Guide: 1964–65 season

Weber State Wildcats men's basketball seasons
Weber State